Ganj Kola-ye Bala (also Romanized as Ganj Kolā-ye Bālā; also known as Bālā Ganjkolāh) is a village in Sajjadrud Rural District, Bandpey-ye Sharqi District, Babol County, Mazandaran Province, Iran. At the 2006 census, its population was 578, in 153 families.

References 

Populated places in Babol County